Thomas Manfredini (born 27 May 1980) is an Italian former professional footballer who played as a centre-back.

Career

SPAL

Udinese

Atalanta
Manfredini was signed by Serie B club Atalanta B.C. on 27 June 2005 for €1.2 million. That week Atalanta also signed half of the registration rights of D'Agostino for €800,000, as well as sold half of the registration rights of Marco Motta and Fausto Rossini to Udinese for €2.05 million and €450,000 respectively, as well as Cesare Natali, Piermario Morosini (50%) and Massimo Gotti for undisclosed fees.

In July 2007, he (along with three other players) were banned from football for a duration of three months as a result of illegal betting.

In October 2008, Manfredini extended his contract with Atalanta to June 2013.

On 26 July 2010, he signed with the newly relegated Serie B side, to remain under contract until 2013 with an option to extend to 30 June 2014. Teammate Gianpaolo Bellini also signed a contract on the same day.

On 9 August 2011, it was announced that Manfredini had again been banned from football for 3 years for his role in match fixing during the 2010–11 season (2011 Italian football scandal). In the appeal of Corte di Giustizia Federale of FIGC, Manfredini was acquitted of the charge.

Genoa
In January 2013, Manfredini left Atalanta and joined Genoa, in a swap deal involving 50% registration rights of Michele Canini. Manfredini was valued €1.25 million, while 50% registration rights of Canini was valued for €1 million.

Sassuolo
In January 2014, Manfredini left Genoa and joined Sassuolo for €900,000 in a -year contract. That window the club also signed Davide Biondini from Genoa in a temporary deal.

Vicenza
On 12 January 2015, Manfredini signed for Vicenza on loan from Sassuolo until the end of the season. He took no.17 shirt from departing Niko Bianconi. On 30 June 2015, Vicenza signed Manfredini outright in a 2-year contract, with Giovanni Sbrissa and became a player of Sassuolo in 2016–17 season. He changed to wear no.5 in 2015–16 season.

On 25 August 2016, he was released.

References

External links
 
  FIGC Italian National Team Appearances

1980 births
Living people
Sportspeople from Ferrara
Association football central defenders
Association football fullbacks
Italian footballers
Italy under-21 international footballers
S.P.A.L. players
Udinese Calcio players
ACF Fiorentina players
Catania S.S.D. players
Rimini F.C. 1912 players
Bologna F.C. 1909 players
Atalanta B.C. players
Genoa C.F.C. players
U.S. Sassuolo Calcio players
L.R. Vicenza players
S.P. La Fiorita players
Serie A players
Serie B players
Footballers from Emilia-Romagna